Israel Rodríguez may refer to:

 Israel Rodríguez (journalist) (born 1974), Puerto Rican journalist
 Israel Rodríguez (volleyball) (born 1981), Spanish volleyball player
 Israel Rodríguez (Ecuadorian footballer)
 Israel Rodríguez (Paraguayan footballer) (born 1982), Paraguayan footballer